Willis Wharf, also known as "Clam Town USA", is an unincorporated community and census-designated place in Northampton County, Virginia, United States. It was first listed as a CDP in the 2020 census with a population of 210.

References

GNIS reference

Unincorporated communities in Virginia
Unincorporated communities in Northampton County, Virginia
Census-designated places in Virginia
Census-designated places in Northampton County, Virginia